The Waterloo Hurricanes were a Canadian junior ice hockey team playing in the Ontario Hockey Association for two seasons between 1950 and 1952. They played at the Waterloo Memorial Arena in Waterloo, Ontario. The team folded after the 1951–52 season due to financial woes. That season, the Hurricanes competed against cross-town rivals, the Kitchener Greenshirts.

Two alumni of the Hurricanes went on to play in the National Hockey League. Goaltender Norm Defelice played 10 games with the Boston Bruins in 1956–57, and had a long career in the Eastern Hockey League. Defenceman Warren Godfrey played 15 fifteen seasons in the NHL with the Boston Bruins and Detroit Red Wings.

The team's name, 'Hurricanes', was decided through a competition held in the community of Waterloo and Kitchener in 1949. The winning name was proposed by Walter Wells (b. 1936), then residing in Waterloo.

Season-by-season results

References

Defunct Ontario Hockey League teams
Sport in Waterloo, Ontario